The Crime (transliterated as El-Gareema) is an Egyptian film. The film is directed and written by Sherif Arafa, and it stars Ahmed Ezz, Menna Shalabi, Maged El Kedwany, Ryad El Khouly, and Sayed Ragab. The film was released on January 5, 2022 in Egypt and on January 20, 2022 in the Gulf states.

Cast
 Ahmed Ezz
 Menna Shalabi
 Maged El Kedwany
 Ryad El Khouly
 Sayed Ragab
 Hajjaj Abdul Azim
 Mohamed Gomaa
 Myrna Noureldin
 Mohamed el-Sharnouby
 Nardin Farag
 Omar Sharif
 Sherif Kholosy
 Mohammed Gaber ( Voice )

Synopsis
The film takes place in the 1970’s and centers on a man named Adel who suffers from hallucinations and is institutionalized. He escapes his mental hospital and becomes a well-paid perpetrator of contract killing and other crimes for hire. One crime he is embroiled in causes him to confess to prior offenses, bringing him into conflict with his former sponsors.

Production and marketing
The first trailer for the movie was released on October 26, 2021.

External links
 El Cinema page
 IMDb page-
 Dhliz page
 Karohat page

References

Egyptian crime films
2022 films
Egyptian action films